The Lawrence County Courthouse  is a courthouse at 315 West Main Street in the center of Walnut Ridge, Arkansas, United States, the county seat of Lawrence County.  It is a modern single-story building, finished in brick with cast stone trim.  It was designed by the Arkansas firm Erhart, Eichenbaum, Rauch & Blass, and was built in 1965–66.  It stylistically embodies the New Formalism movement in architecture of that period, with tall and narrow windows topped by cast stone panels, and a flat-roof canopy sheltering a plate glass entrance area.

The building was listed on the National Register of Historic Places in 2015.

See also

 National Register of Historic Places listings in Lawrence County, Arkansas
 List of county courthouses in Arkansas

References

Government buildings completed in 1966
Buildings and structures in Lawrence County, Arkansas
County courthouses in Arkansas
Courthouses on the National Register of Historic Places in Arkansas
National Register of Historic Places in Lawrence County, Arkansas